African Americans in Oregon or Black Oregonians are residents of the state of Oregon who are of African American ancestry. In 2017, there were an estimated 91,000 African Americans in Oregon.

History 

African-Americans, like Blacks in other states, were historically discriminated against, but much more strongly contrasted to the rest of the US. When Oregon became a state in 1859, it was the only US state restricting people of certain ethnic backgrounds from owning land. From 1844 to 1936 the Government of Oregon set up restrictions and laws prohibiting people of African descent from residing in the state, which has caused socio economic issues that still exist today.

In the early 20th century, the African American population became heavily represented in the timber industry, transforming it into one of Oregon's most diverse trades.

Notable African-American Oregonians 

 Tanya Barfield, playwright
 Dick Bogle, first Black television reporter in the Pacific Northwest
 Beatrice Morrow Cannady, civil rights activist and co-founder of the Portland branch of the NAACP
 Brandon Gonzáles, boxer of both Black and Mexican descent
 A. C. Green, professional basketball player
 Charles Jordan, first Black city commissioner for Portland
 Gladys McCoy, politician
 Harriet Redmond, suffragette
 McCants Stewart, first African-American lawyer in Oregon.
 Aminé, Rapper

See also

List of African-American newspapers in Oregon
Native American peoples of Oregon
Racism in Oregon

References

Further reading

 
African-American history of Oregon